Mycetobia divergens is a species of wood gnat in the family Anisopodidae.

References

Anisopodidae
Articles created by Qbugbot
Insects described in 1856
Taxa named by Francis Walker (entomologist)